The Jupiter Theft is a 1977 science fiction novel by American writer Donald Moffitt, re-printed in 2003 with a new afterword.

Plot summary
The initial part of the novel mixes near-future thriller and disaster novel scenarios that focusses on the discovery of a moving gamma-ray sources headed towards Earth from the direction of Cygnus X-1. The diversion of a Chinese-American joint Jupiter mission to investigate the new Solar System intruder. The Chinese and Americans are mutually antagonistic politically, espionage, and suspicion must be overcome for the Jupiter Mission to go ahead.

Once the Mission intercepts the intruder, the story shifts into an alien contact scenario. The "intruder" is actually the silicate core of a Jovian planet which is orbited by a moon and five immense alien spacecraft. The Jupiter Mission is intercepted mid-space by aliens, dubbed Cygnans, that rides on matter-annihilation powered "broomsticks".  

The mission is essentially destroyed with the surviving crew taken alive as specimens for a Cygnan zoo. 

Now imprisoned, the Sino-American crew attempt to contact the Cygnans and seek to discover their true purpose of appearing in this Solar System. Using a Moog synthesizer and their natural gift of perfect pitch, one of the crew learns to understand and then "speak" the Cygnan musical language.  The Sino-Americans learn more about the Cygnan through their didactic historical films.

The Sino-Americans discover that the Cygnans have travelled for 6,000 light years escaping a home planet orbiting the progenitor star of Cygnus X-1. The Cygnans discovered that it was on course to collapse to a black hole that now occupies their origin in space. While searching for a new home and to do so, they raided numerous star systems for Jupiter-mass "gas giant" planets to use as fuel. 

The stop-off proved to be a particularly significant one because after they found in every other visited habitable planets heading progressively further from the Galactic Center of the Milky Way that they had already been populated with intelligent beings. Their next destination is Andromeda with the hope that a new galaxy may offer better results.

A fluffy pink bird-like humanoid, 61 Cygni, was another zoo kept prisoner. 61 who helped the earthlings with escaping the Cygnans. 

The Sino-Americans foil a last-ditch sabotage attempt and escape the starship just before the strange convoy was planning to leave our Solar System. Their escape from the zoo required a working example of a new Cygnan Thrust System that the Sino-Americans develop into a much faster though still, barely, subluminal, and more efficient that could use passing comets to fuel this system instead of stealing entire planets.

1977 American novels
1977 science fiction novels
Fiction set on Jupiter
Del Rey books
Novels by Donald Moffitt
Interpreting and translation in fiction
Novels about alien visitations
American science fiction novels